The American Train Dispatchers Association or Train Dispatchers is an American trade union representing railroad workers. The Train Dispatchers belong to the AFL–CIO as one of the organization's smallest members.

Jurisdictions
ATDA operates mostly as a craft union representing railroad dispatchers. Specialized forms of dispatchers including trick train dispatchers, night chief dispatchers and assistant chief dispatchers are also members of the union.

The organization also represents the crafts that provide power to electrified trains, mostly on commuter lines. The titles in this jurisdiction are power supervisors, power directors and load dispatchers.

On short line railroads, the organization acts as more of an industrial union and also represents trainmen, enginemen, maintenance of way employees, mechanics and clerical staff.

Employers
The Train Dispatchers hold collective bargaining agreements with the following companies:
 Alaska Railroad
 Amtrak
 Burlington Northern and Santa Fe Railway
 Belt Railway of Chicago
 Conrail Shared Assets
 CSX
 Grand Trunk Western Railroad (CN)
 Indiana Harbor Belt Railroad
 Kansas City Southern Railway
 Massachusetts Bay Commuter Railroad
 Metra
 Montana Rail Link
 New Jersety Transit
 Norfolk Southern
 PATH
 Soo Line (CP)
 South Shore Line
 Staten Island Railway
 Terminal Railroad Association of St. Louis
 Wisconsin Central Ltd. (CN)

History
The union was founded in 1917 at a convention in Spokane, Washington. An earlier organization called the Train Dispatchers Association of America preceded the establishment of the ATDA by 27 years. During the Great Railroad Strike of 1922, the Train Dispatchers did not participate but neither would they perform work of other unions.

See also
 Rail traffic controller
 Train Dispatcher (computer simulation)

References

External links
 Cornell Library ATDA Archives
 Constitution and Bylaws

AFL–CIO
Dispatchers
Organizations based in Cleveland
Trade unions established in 1917
Railway unions in the United States
Trade unions in the United States